The Crookston Daily Times is an American twice weekly newspaper published weekday afternoons in Crookston, Minnesota. It is owned by CherryRoad Media.

The newspaper covers Crookston and Polk County, Minnesota, and is one of two daily newspapers published in the Greater Grand Forks metropolitan area. The Crookston Daily Times is the smallest daily newspaper in Minnesota, and one of the smallest daily newspapers in the United States.

References

External links 
 

Gannett publications
Greater Grand Forks
Newspapers published in Minnesota
Polk County, Minnesota
Publications established in 1891